The Popeye Moto Club, also referred to as the Popeye(s) MC, and often shortened to simply The Popeyes was a French-Canadian outlaw motorcycle club and criminal organization based across the province of Quebec. At the group's peak, they were believed to be the largest club in Montreal and the second-largest outlaw motorcycle club in Canada, behind Satan's Choice. They were also the largest of the French-speaking clubs in the country.

History
The Popeye Moto Club was founded by Michel "Sky" Langlois and Roger Calve. The year of the club's formation has been variously reported as either 1951 or 1965, with the latter seeming more likely. Inspired by the fictional character Popeye the Sailor Man, the Popeyes' patch featured the character smoking his signature tobacco pipe whilst riding on a cruiser motorcycle. Headquartered at 4862 Drolet St., Montreal, Quebec, the club established several additional chapters throughout the province, located in Drummondville, Gatineau, Laval, Quebec City, Rive-Sud, Sherbrooke, Sorel-Tracy, and Trois Rivieres. At their largest, the Popeyes were estimated to have several hundred members across Quebec.

The Popeyes were regarded to be the most violent outlaw biker club in Quebec, and were notorious for engaging in gratuitous and sadistic violence, which is part of the reason why they were later chosen by the Hells Angels for recruitment. They had the reputation for being the most prosperous and the most violent motorcycle club in Montreal. As one of the most notorious and dominant biker gangs in the province, the Popeyes had a strict policy towards other motorcycle clubs whose logos featured a red and white color scheme. On multiple occasions, they would strip the patches of clubs bearing red and white colors, and subsequently burn them. Some of the clubs that would be affected by the Popeyes' rules included the Zombi MC, Black Angels MC and Escape Hell MC. Another Quebecois club, the Drummondville-based Mongols MC (unrelated to the U.S.-based club of the same name), was absorbed by the Popeyes's Rive-Sud chapter in late 1974. Among the Mongols' members was future Popeye president Yves Buteau.

Criminal activities

In the early 1970s, the Popeyes began working as "muscle" for the Dubois Brothers, a prominent crime family in Montreal. Popeyes members initially worked as assassins and later on as drug dealers. They also became involved with the Montreal Mafia.

Devil's Disciples War
From 1968 up until 1970, a short but violent turf war for control of the drug trade went between the Popeyes and Devil's Disciples MC, another Canadian outlaw biker gang (unrelated to the similarly named U.S.-based club).

A violent confrontation that involved roughly 100 people, both members of the Popeyes and the Devil's Disciples, occurred on 1 June 1968. The skirmish involved the use of chains and baseball bats and left four belligerents seriously wounded. On 17 June 1968, a knife fight broke out between both gangs after a group of ten Popeye MC members blocked the road on Fabre Street in Jacques Cartier while eight members of the Devil’s Disciples were riding there. The engagement led to the death of 18-year old Devil's Disciples member Jean-Yves Picquet, who later died of stab wounds.

In March 1969, French singer-songwriter Johnny Hallyday went on tour in the province of Quebec. As a well-known musical icon in the French-speaking world, he was very popular among the Québécois people – including the Popeye MC, who were big fans of his. When he arrived to perform shows across Quebec, he was welcomed by members of the Popeyes from different chapters. During his stay, Popeyes acted as security for Hallyday at his concerts. Jacques "Coco" Mercier, the president of the rivaling Devil's Disciples, saw the beloved singer's association with the Popeyes to be disrespectful as they, too, were fans of his. This angered the Devil's Disciples, who responded by making public death threats towards Hallyday. When the singer later returned to Quebec for another tour the following year, the Devil's Disciples followed through with their threats they had made and shot at him while he was eating at a restaurant in downtown Montreal. Hallyday was not injured in the shooting, but this attempt on his life caused him to distance himself from the Popeyes.

Later in May of that same year, Popeye Moto Club member Pierre Boucher was stabbed to death by three members of the Devil’s Disciples, including Andre Bureau. An autopsy report yielded that Boucher sustained a total of 58 knife wounds as a result of the stabbing. By 1976, the Devil's Disciples had disbanded after fifteen of their members had been murdered by one criminal group or another.

Satan's Choice war

With Satan's Choice MC being backed by the Outlaws Motorcycle Club, a rival of the Hells Angels, it caused conflict between them and the Popeyes MC, who were allied with the Hells Angels. This led to a two-year war between Satan's Choice and the Popeyes which resulted in the death of at least one Popeyes patch-holder and the injuries of many Satan's Choice members.

Additional crimes
After stealing a motorcycle from a Popeye Moto Club member, Jean-Marie Viel was shot and killed by Montreal chapter president Yves Trudeau in 1970. His body was discovered in a field that was located not far from the club's Trois-Rivieres chapter clubhouse.

Police in Montreal were phoned in July 1970 following an apparent gunfight that took place between the Popeye Moto Club and another outlaw motorcycle club. Police later questioned 13 members of the Popeyes at their Montreal clubhouse where three shotguns and a machete were discovered.

During the month of August in 1976, A group of 50 Popeyes members were arrested after they had been involved in trashing a hotel. Among the group members is their President, Yves Buteau.

Dissolution and legacy
The Popeyes were patched over by the Hells Angels Motorcycle Club in 1977 to form the Hells Angels Montreal chapter (a.k.a. the North Chapter), establishing the very first Hells Angels chapter in Canada. However, only a fraction of the Popeyes members were considered worthy of wearing the Hells Angels kutte and gang colors. A total of 35 members are believed to have patched over, the rest being either not interested or not up to the standard that the Hells Angels required. The North Chapter, itself, consisted mostly of former Popeyes members.

Notorious Hells Angels hitman Yves "Apache" Trudeau was initially a member of the Popeye MC until they were absorbed by the Hells Angels. At 22, Trudeau joined the east-end Montreal chapter of the Popeye Moto Club, which started off his criminal career. He went on to commit over 40 murders while a member of both the Popeyes and the Hells Angels.

Other Popeye members that later became famous Hells Angels include Laurent "L'Anglais" Viau, Normand "Billy" Labelle, Denis "Le Cure" Kennedy, Jean-Pierre “Matt le Crosseur” Mathieu, Jean-Guy “Brutus” Geoffrion and Michel "Sky" Langlois. Trudeau, Langlois and Viau all played a role in the infamous Lennoxville massacre.

References 

Organizations established in 1964
1964 establishments in Quebec
Organizations disestablished in 1977
1977 disestablishments in Quebec
Outlaw motorcycle clubs
Motorcycle clubs in Canada
Gangs in Montreal
Hells Angels